Mirbelia corallina is a species of flowering plant in the family Fabaceae and is endemic to the far west of Western Australia. It is a slender, sprawling sub-shrub with a few narrowly elliptic to narrowly egg-shaped leaves and pink and yellow flowers arranged in racemes near the ends of the branchlets.

Description

Taxonomy
Mirbelia corallina was first formally described in 2012 by Ryonen Butcher in the journal Nuytsia from specimens collected in Kalbarri National Park in 2008. The specific epithet (corallina) means "coral-coloured", referring to the distinctive colour of the flowers.

Distribution and habitat
This mirbelia grows on sandplains and winter-wet places in kwongan and shrubland near Kalbarri and mostly in Kalbarri National Park, in the Geraldton Sandplains bioregion of western, Western Australia.

Conservation status
This mirbelia is listed as "Priority Three" by the Government of Western Australia Department of Biodiversity, Conservation and Attractions, meaning that it is poorly known and known from only a few locations but is not under imminent threat.

References

Mirbelioids
corallina
Fabales of Australia
Flora of Western Australia
Plants described in 2012